Mar Thoma Residential School (MTRS) is a co-educational institution located at Kuttapuzha, in the town of Tiruvalla, Kerala, India, 1km from the town centre. It is affiliated to the Indian Certificate of Secondary Education and follows the ICSE syllabus. Enrolment is approximately 1600 students with a staff of 70 teachers. The medium of teaching is English. The school has a teachers training institute.

The school was started in 1974 by the Mar Thoma Educational Agency, Tiruvalla, which is a charitable body registered under the Travancore - Cochin Literary Scientific and Charitable Societies Registration Act XII of 1955. The school is situated in 5.5 acres.

The school has classes starting from kindergarten to 12th Standard. It houses separate hostel accommodations for boys and girls, a football ground, a basketball ground and a volleyball ground. Indoor games like table tennis and badminton are supported in an internal auditorium. MTRS has received the overall championship for All Kerala Inter school cultural and sports meets continuously for many years. The school was the venue for the All Kerala Cultural Fest called "Tarang".

The school has inter-school teams for football, cricket, volleyball, culture and quizzing.
 
The school provides transportation facility for the students. MTRS has an alumni association for alumni across the globe. The Malayalam film actress Meera Jasmine (Jasmine Mary Joseph) was a student of the school. Famous people related to the Malayalam film industry, like Nayanthara, Adoor Gopalakrishnan, and Kunchacko Boban have also visited the school on various occasions.

External links
http://www.ovguide.com/marthoma-residential-school-9202a8c04000641f8000000012e80ac0
http://mtrschool.org/mtrs/index.php?option=com_content&view=article&id=48%3Amarthoma-residential-school&catid=34%3Anews&Itemid=1

Boarding schools in Kerala
Christian schools in Kerala
Primary schools in Kerala
High schools and secondary schools in Kerala
Schools in Pathanamthitta district
Educational institutions established in 1974
1974 establishments in Kerala